Konrad II the Gray (c. 1340 – 10 June 1403) was a Duke of Oleśnica, Koźle and half of Bytom since 1366 and Duke of half of Ścinawa since 1397 until his death.

He was the second child but only son of Duke Konrad I of Oleśnica by his second wife Euphemia, daughter of Władysław, Duke of Koźle-Bytom.

Life
After the death of his father in 1366, Konrad II inherited all his lands as one and only ruler. Little is known about his rule. In 1377 he named his only son and heir, the future Konrad III, as his co-ruler.

In 1397 he received half of Ścinawa as payment after the death of Henry VIII the Sparrow.

Marriage and issue
By 23 February 1354 Konrad II married with Agnes (b. 1338 – d. by 27 April 1371), daughter of Casimir I, Duke of Cieszyn. They had one son:
Konrad III the Old (b. ca. 1359 – d. 28 December 1412).

References

Chronological Dates in Stoyan
KONRAD II 'DER GROE HIRRE' (OLEŚNICKI, SIWY)
This article was translated from his original version in Polish Wikipedia.

|-

|-

|-

1340s births
1403 deaths
Piast dynasty